Five Lines (Pente grammai/Πέντε Γραμμαί) is the modern name of an ancient Greek tables game. Two players each move five counters on a board with five lines, with moves likely determined by the roll of a die. The winner may have been the first one to place their pieces on the central "sacred line". No complete description of the game exists, but there have been several scholarly reconstructions, including Schädler's and Kidd's.

History 
Gameboards, consisting of five parallel lines with circles at the ends, have been found at many sites in ancient Greece, sometimes carved right into the floors of temples. The earliest known examples were found in Anagyros, Attica, and date to the 7th century BCE. The first written mention is by Alkaios, around 600 BCE. Attic vases dated to around 500 BCE show Ajax and Achilles playing the game, with over 160 extant. Later, Julius Pollux describes the game in Onomasticon (9.97-98). Pollux writes: "on the five lines from either side there was a middle one called the sacred line. And moving a piece already arrived there gave rise to the proverb 'he moves the piece from the sacred line'." He does not give the game a name, but it is usually called Five Lines by scholars. At this point, the game had likely already stopped being played, since he described it as an element of history.

Gameplay 
Two players each move five pieces on a board with five lines, likely counter-clockwise. The winner may have been the first one place their pieces on the central line, called the "sacred line" (sometimes also translated as "holy"). The number of lines do not appear to be strictly limited to five, although this is the most common version; when there are more lines the game is likely played with a corresponding number of pieces. The game is played with dice, though the exact method of advancing the pieces is not known.

Proverbial references to moving a piece from the sacred line occur regularly in Ancient Greek texts, but having one's pieces on the sacred line was usually considered a win condition, so it is unclear why a player would want to move ones pieces from the line "to gain the upper hand" as mentioned by Alcaeus. Stephen Kidd argues that moving a piece from the holy line was a rare and aggressive move.

References 

Board games